Arthur Hoeber (23 July 1854 New York City – 29 April 1915 Nutley, New Jersey) was a United States painter best known for his writing on art-related subjects.

Biography
He studied with James Carroll Beckwith at the Art Students League of New York, and with Jean-Léon Gérôme in Paris at the École des Beaux Arts. He exhibited for the first time at the Salon in 1882 (“Sur la Grande Route”; in 1885 his offering was “Le Pain Quotidien”) and was a contributor to most American exhibitions. While well known as a successful painter, his reputation perhaps rests on his art criticism. He was art director for the New York Times for three years and was assistant editor of The Illustrated American for one year. He later was art critic for the New York Globe and Commercial Advertiser. He was also widely known as a lecturer on art subjects. He was a member of the International Art Association of Chicago, and was elected an associate of the National Academy. During the last years of his life, Hoeber resided on The Enclosure, a street in Nutley, New Jersey, that had long been the home to many artists.

Works
His popular writings include The Treasures of the Metropolitan Museum of Art (1892) and Painting in the Nineteenth Century in France, Belgium, Spain and Italy.

References

External links
 
 
 Artwork by Arthur Hoeber

1854 births
1915 deaths
American art educators
19th-century American painters
American male painters
20th-century American painters
American art critics
American alumni of the École des Beaux-Arts
Painters from New York City
The New York Times people
Writers from New York City
19th-century American writers
20th-century American non-fiction writers
National Academy of Design associates
19th-century American male writers
20th-century American male writers
American male non-fiction writers
19th-century American male artists
20th-century American male artists